The Lomas Coloradas Formation is a Mesozoic geologic formation in Mexico. Dinosaur remains are among the fossils that have been recovered from the formation, although only a few have yet been referred to a specific genus. Indetermiate hadrosaur remains and indeterminate sauropod remains, most likely belonging to Alamosaurus, have been unearthed here.

Dinosaurs

See also

 List of dinosaur-bearing rock formations
 List of stratigraphic units with indeterminate dinosaur fossils

Footnotes

References
 Weishampel, David B.; Dodson, Peter; and Osmólska, Halszka (eds.): The Dinosauria, 2nd, Berkeley: University of California Press. 861 pp. .

Upper Cretaceous Series of North America